Ishq Hai is a Pakistani television series directed by Aabis Raza and produced by Fahad Mustafa and Ali Kazmi under the banner Big Bang Entertainment. The series features Danish Taimoor and Minal Khan in leading roles while Saba Faisal, Babar Ali, Hammad Shoaib and Mahenur Haider in supporting cast.

The series was highly rated and received negative reviews.

Plot 
Isra and Shahzaib are in love with each other and want to marry. However, Shahzaib's mother is against the Affair as she wants to marry Shahzaib with her niece. On the other hand, Isra also faces the same problem from her elders. Her brother is against the girls' will about marriage and her father one day decides her marriage with a guy played by Hammad Shoaib. On the wedding day, Shahzaib kidnaps Isra and threatens him at gunpoint to marry her. Stucked in necessitation Isra agrees and both become husband and wife. On the other side, all at Isra's home assumes that Isra has eloped from marriage by her own will.

Cast 
 Minal Khan as Isra
 Danish Taimoor as Shahzaib
 Azekah Daniel as Naina
 Mahenur Haider as Nimra
 Faraz Farooqui as Hammad
 Hammad Shoaib as Haris
 Babar Ali as Isra's father
 Farah Nadeem as Farhat
 Saba Faisal as Shahzaib's mother
 Rashid Farooqui
 Saife Hassan
 Saima Qureshi as Saba
 Sajjad Pal as Raza
 Mahi Baloch as Sameera 
 Tabbasum Arif as Maryam (Haris's mother)

Reception 

The series was one of the highest series during its broadcast in July–August 2021.

The serial received negative reviews from the critics. It received criticism and poor reviews and being labelled as "problematic" by some due to toxic masculinity portrayal of obsession as love and huge toxic characters in the plot.

Accolades

Lux Style Awards

References 

Pakistani drama television series
ARY Digital original programming
2021 Pakistani television series debuts
Urdu-language television shows